Tram Hollow is a valley in Ripley County in the U.S. state of Missouri.

Tram Hollow was so named on account of the tramway the valley once contained.

References

Valleys of Ripley County, Missouri
Valleys of Missouri